Bergevin or De Bergevin is a surname. Notable people with the surname include:

 Achille Bergevin (1870–1933), Canadian politician in the province of Quebec
 Célestin Bergevin (1832–1910), farmer and political figure in Quebec
 Édouard de Bergevin (1861–1925), French painter of the Rouen school
 Marc Bergevin (born 1965), Canadian professional ice hockey executive and former player

See also
 The Bergevin Brothers, American Seattle-based band